Hans Olav Tungesvik (22 May 1936  – 16 June 2017) was a Norwegian physician  and Member of Parliament  for the Christian Democratic Party.

Biography
Tungesvik was born at  Skånevik in Hordaland, Norway. 
He graduated from the University of Oslo with a cand.med. degree in 1964 and became a specialist in psychiatry in 1975. 
He had his own practice from 1985 to 2008. From 1995 to 1997 he was associated with Modum Bads Nervesanatorium, an institution for the treatment of mental disorders at Modum. Tungesvik was a member of Kvinnherad municipality council from 1967 to 1969 and Etne municipality council from 1971 to 1975. He was elected to the Norwegian Parliament from Hordaland in 1977, and was re-elected on one occasion. He was the chairman of Noregs Mållag from 1965 to 1970.

Personal life
He was awarded the King's Medal of Merit (Kongens fortjenstmedalje) in gold during 2007.

He was the father of  jurist Steinulf Tungesvik.

Hans Olav Tungesvik died in 2017 at the age of 81.

References

Other sources

 Hans Christian Tungesvik er sønnesønn av Hans Olav Tungesvik

1936 births
2017 deaths
People from Etne
University of Oslo alumni
Norwegian psychiatrists
Christian Democratic Party (Norway) politicians
Noregs Mållag leaders
Members of the Storting
20th-century Norwegian politicians
Recipients of the King's Medal of Merit in gold
Road incident deaths in Norway